Randalia is a city in Fayette County, Iowa, United States. The population was 51 at the time of the 2020 census.

Geography
Randalia is located at  (42.862196, -91.886814).

Demographics

2010 census
As of the census of 2010, there were 68 people, 29 households, and 21 families living in the city. The racial makeup of the city was 94.1% White and 5.9% from two or more races.

There were 29 households, of which 27.6% had children under the age of 18 living with them, 65.5% were married couples living together, 6.9% had a male householder with no wife present, and 27.6% were non-families. 27.6% of all households were made up of individuals, and 3.4% had someone living alone who was 65 years of age or older. The average household size was 2.34 and the average family size was 2.76.

The median age in the city was 41.5 years. 17.6% of residents were under the age of 18; 11.9% were between the ages of 18 and 24; 22.1% were from 25 to 44; 30.9% were from 45 to 64; and 17.6% were 65 years of age or older. The gender makeup of the city was 55.9% male and 44.1% female.

2000 census
As of the census of 2000, there were 84 people, 32 households, and 22 families living in the city. The racial makeup of the city was 100.00% White.

There were 32 households, out of which 31.3% had children under the age of 18 living with them, 53.1% were married couples living together, 12.5% had a female householder with no husband present, and 31.3% were non-families. 21.9% of all households were made up of individuals, and 6.3% had someone living alone who was 65 years of age or older. The average household size was 2.63 and the average family size was 3.18.

In the city, the population was spread out, with 26.2% under the age of 18, 10.7% from 18 to 24, 26.2% from 25 to 44, 19.0% from 45 to 64, and 17.9% who were 65 years of age or older. The median age was 36 years. For every 100 females, there were 78.7 males. For every 100 females age 18 and over, there were 87.9 males.

The median income for a household in the city was $36,875, and the median income for a family was $40,625. Males had a median income of $25,625 versus $23,571 for females. The per capita income for the city was $12,018. There were 24.0% of families and 23.6% of the population living below the poverty line, including 34.6% of under eighteens and 41.7% of those over 64.

Decline
Locals in Randalia have been finding their community in a state of decline. In October 2007, the city lost its post office, some time after losing its school and general store.

Education
The West Central Community School District operates local area public schools.

References

Cities in Fayette County, Iowa
Cities in Iowa